Events in the year 2018 in Yemen.

Incumbents
President: Abdrabbuh Mansur Hadi 
Prime Minister: 
 Ahmed Obeid bin Daghr ( 4 April 2016 – 15 October 2018 )
 Maeen Abdulmalik Saeed (18 October 2018 - )

Events
Ongoing since April 2015 – Battle of Taiz
28 to 31 January – Battle of Aden
26 March – The Houthis launch a barrage of rockets at Saudi Arabia, killing an Egyptian man and leaving two others wounded in Riyadh.
22 April – An airstrike occurs in Hajjah Governorate. The attack left between 33, 43 and 55 deaths.
3 May - The United Arab Emirates deployed over 100 soldiers to the island of Socotra in an unofficial military deployment, dismissed Yemeni personnel, and took administrative control of Socotra Airport and seaport.
3 July - 46 detainees are released from the Beir Ahmed prison, following reporting by the Associated Press about torture and abuse occurring there.
9 August - A Saudi airstrike hit a bus in the Dahyan air strike, Sa'dah, reportedly killing dozens of children.
1 September - Saudi Arabia and the United Arab Emirates say that the bombing of a school bus in Yemen by Saudi Arabian aircraft, which killed 51 people, was "unjustified".
3 December - A flight chartered by the United Nations evacuated 50 wounded Houthi fighters to Muscat, Oman for medical treatment, as part of the peace talks.

Deaths

17 February – Abdul Salam al-Haddad, diplomat, Ambassador to Germany, Kuwait and Ethiopia.
19 April – Saleh Ali al-Sammad, de facto President of Yemen (b. 1979)

References

 
2010s in Yemen
Years of the 21st century in Yemen
Yemen
Yemen